Bhailo and Deusi, collectively known as Deusi/Bhailo, are traditional folk songs sung during the Tihar festival in Nepal as well as in Darjeeling hills, Sikkim, Assam, and some other parts of India among Nepali diaspora. Children as well as adults perform Deusi/Bhailo by singing songs and dancing as they go to various homes in their community, collecting money, sweets and food and giving blessings for prosperity.  

Bhailo is generally performed by girls and women on the night of Lakshmi Puja whereas Deusi is performed by boys and men on the following night. Although in recent years, mixed groups perform it collectively on either of the two nights or both. The girls performing Bhailo are called Bhailini and the boys performing Deusi are called Deuse. At the end of these songs, the house owner serves food and gives money to the Deusi/Bhailo singers and dancers. In return, the Deusi/Bhailo team gives blessings of good fortune and prosperity.

Origin stories 
There exists three major stories about the origin of the practice of performing Deusi/Bhailo. The stories varies according to the places and ethnic groups. The three stories are given as:

Vamana and Bali 

According to Hindu mythology, King Mahabali, the great grandson of Hiranyakashipu, the grandson of Prahlada and the son of Virochana was a very generous and intelligent Daitya king of Patala. He once defeated Devas and their king Indra and claimed the throne of Devaloka (heaven). The Devas then went to Lord Vishnu seeking help. After his victory, King Bali decided to perform Ashvamedha ritual. While the ritual was being performed, Lord Vishnu appeared before Bali in his dwarf priest avatar, Vamana. It was customary to donate to a priest or sage during rituals. So, the king asked Vamana to make his wish. Vamana asked for three feet of land. King Bali agreed to donate three feet of land to the Vamana priest.  

Vamana placed his first step but he began to expand in size. He became so big that his single foot covered the whole Earth. The second step covered the Devaloka (heaven). There was no place for Vamana to place his third step. So, the king offered his own head to Vamana to place the third step. As Vamana placed his foot on Bali's head, Bali collapsed back to Patala Loka (subterranean realms). King Bali then asked a wish with Vamana, to be able to ascend to Mṛtyuloka (the world of the dead). Lord Vishnu allowed King Bali to be able to ascend to Mṛtyuloka for five days on Yama Panchak.  

The people then started performing Deusi in honour of Mahabali's generosity. The word Deusire is said to originated from the words Deu and sire, translating to give and head, in Nepali language. In Bhailo too, a verse in the song refers to King Bali.

Baliraja of Jumla 

According to another story, there once lived a pregnant woman and she arrived in a place named Kallai in the present day Jumla district of Nepal. According to Jagaman Gurung, a cultural expert, the woman might have been involved in an incest or other taboo activity and hence fled her home and arrived in Kallai. Later, the woman gave birth to a son named Bali. The Khas reign in Jumla had fallen and there was no ruler. One day, a sage named Chandannath arrived at that place and found Bali to be worthy as a ruler. He declared Bali as the king of Jumla. Bali's dynasty later became the Kallala dynasty. During his rule, slavery was practiced. Poor people would sacrifice their children at the temple. But later the practice changed and people would offer their children to the temple to live as Devdas (lit. male slave of god) and Devdasi (lit. female slave of god). Once every year, the king would permit the Devdas and Devdasi to visit the village and receive offering from them. So, the Devdasi went to sing 'Bhailo' (from the Nepali word Bhalo, meaning wellness) and the Devdas would sing 'Devdas Re'. The practice later become the Deusi/Bhailo tradition.

Another variation of the legend attributes the origin of the tradition to the battle between Baliraja of Jumla and Timur during the 14th century. After defeat of Baliraja in the war, the song and dance is said to have performed to collect taxes from the people by the king.

Balihang of Palpa 
According to another legend, the origin of this tradition is attributed to Magar people. In Magar community, Bhailo is known as Garra Bhailo. Once when Balihang, the king of Palpa is said to be threatened by Kāla (Death). So, in order to avoid Kāla, he order his subjects to decorate and light up their houses and to sing 'Failo' (lit. he survived). Observing the devotion of the people to their king, Kāla is said to return back without taking the king with him. And hence, the tradition is said to have continued every year.

Performance 
The Deusi/Bhailo programme provides cultural entertainment by a group of men and/or women who move around their local area singing the Deusi/Bhailo song and other songs. The group is usually composed of a lead chanter/singer and a chorus group and sometimes additional participants such as musicians and dancers. The lead chanter/singer wishes blessings upon the owners of the house where the team visits. Traditionally, the programme is all live and uses minimal electronic instruments. The entire programme can last from about 10 minutes to half an hour in one house. Then the group moves to another location to perform. 

The programme is held on the third and fourth days of Tihar, where Bhailo is performed on the third day (Laxmi Puja) and Deusi is performed on the fourth day (Gowardhan Puja).

Lyrics 
During Deusi/Bhailo, children as well as adults visit the houses in their neighbourhood and villages, The songs sung during Deusi/Bhailo are mostly blessings for the house owner. The singers sing about the hardship they endured to reach the house and give blessing to the house owner. The lyrics may also contain humorous reference to house owner. 

In the Deusi performance, a leader of the group sings the main line whereas other members repeat "Deusi Re" after each line. In the Bhailo performance, the whole group sings in a unison. 

A typical Bhailo verse is given as:

References

Nepalese folk music
Nepalese culture
Culture of Sikkim
Khas culture
Magar culture